Opinion polling for the 2014 New Zealand general election has been commissioned throughout the duration of the 50th New Zealand Parliament by various organisations. The five main polling organisations are Fairfax Media (Fairfax Media Ipsos), MediaWorks New Zealand (3 News Reid Research), The New Zealand Herald (Herald Digipoll), Roy Morgan Research, and Television New Zealand (One News Colmar Brunton). The sample size, margin of error and confidence interval of each poll varies by organisation and date.

Party vote and key events
Refusals are generally excluded from the party vote percentages, while question wording and the treatment of "don't know" responses and those not intending to vote may vary between survey organisations.

Graphical summary
The first graph below shows trend lines averaged across all polls for parties that received 5.0% or more of the party vote at the 2011 election. The second graph shows parties that received 1.0% or more (but less than 5.0%) of the party vote, or won an electorate seat, at the 2011 election. Parties which have polled over 1.0% since the 2011 election are also included.

Individual polls

Preferred Prime Minister

Electorate polling
The leftmost party columns are the parties, and their sitting Members of Parliament, that held the seats as a result of the 2011 election.

Epsom

Tāmaki Makaurau

Te Tai Tokerau

Te Tai Tonga

Waiariki

See also
Opinion polling for the 2011 New Zealand general election
Opinion polling for the 2017 New Zealand general election
Politics of New Zealand

Notes

References

 
2014 New Zealand general election
New Zealand